The Coomera River is a perennial river located in the South East region of Queensland, Australia.

Course and features

Rising in Lamington National Park below the Lamington plateau in the locality of Binna Burra and a few kilometres north of the New South Wales/Queensland border, the Coomera River descends over the spectacular Coomera Falls in the Coomera Gorge. Prior to reaching the Broadwater the river diverts into two streams to form the North Branch of the river that flows to the west and north of Coomera Island and heads towards Jumpinpin Channel to join the Pimpama River. Further upstream, the river flows around Foxwell Island. This river is one of a number which flow north from the Tweed Valley shield volcano. Downstream the river flows between Coomera and Oxenford. The Coomera River then enters the northern tip of the Gold Coast Broadwater at Paradise Point. The river descends  over its  course.

Amphibious snake species have been recently sighted in the river catchment by geographers.

The river's length is approximately 80 km. Freshwater parts reach mostly to a maximum of  but some parts at waterholes and below waterfalls can exceed .

The lower estuary area is a fast-growing residential area. Sanctuary Cove and  Santa Barbara are all becoming home to increasing numbers of people. A former sand mine near the Pacific Motorway is being investigated for development of a rowing course.

The upper tidal areas are popular for waterskiing and wakeboarding. The upper Coomera River is home 18 regionally significant species including the platypus.

Further multiple road crossings of the river occur upstream.

History
In May 1827 Patrick Logan was the first non-Indigenous person to discover the river. The waterway was originally named the Arrowsmith after a London cartographic firm by Robert Dixon, a government surveyor.  However Thomas Mitchell, the Colonial Surveyor General, overruled this and other names, replacing them with Aboriginal names. It was also known as the Kumera Kumera.

The name Coomera comes from a Bundjalung language (Ngaraangbal dialect) word kumera referring to a wattle tree, whose bark was used to stupify fish.

See also

References

External links 

 
 
 
 
 

Rivers of Queensland
South East Queensland
Scenic Rim Region
Geography of Gold Coast, Queensland
Gondwana Rainforests of Australia